Austria (minor planet designation: 136 Austria) is a main-belt asteroid that was found by the prolific asteroid discoverer Johann Palisa on 18 March 1874, from the Austrian Naval Observatory in Pola, Istria. It was his first asteroid discovery and was given the Latin name of his homeland.

Based upon its spectrum, it is classified as an M-type spectrum, although Clark et al. (1994) suggest it may be more like an S-type asteroid. It shows almost no absorption features in the near infrared, which may indicate an iron or enstatite chondrite surface composition. A weak hydration feature was detected in 2006.

Photometric observations of this asteroid at the European Southern Observatory in 1981 gave a light curve with a period of 11.5 ± 0.1 hours and a brightness variation of 0.40 in magnitude. As of 2013, the estimated rotation period is 11.4969 hours.

References

External links 
 
 

000136
Discoveries by Johann Palisa
Named minor planets
000136
000136
18740318